Mishcherovo (Mişär) is a rural locality (a village) in Toshkurovsky Selsoviet, Baltachevsky District, Bashkortostan, Russia. The population was 164 as of 2010. There are 5  streets.

Geography 
Mishcherovo is located 9 km north of Starobaltachevo (the district's administrative centre) by road. Chipchikovo is the nearest rural locality.

References 

Rural localities in Baltachevsky District